Mudrinić is a surname. Notable people with the surname include:

 Vladimir Mudrinić (born 1976), Serbian football player
  (born 1955), Croatian politician

Serbian surnames
Croatian surnames